Zinc hydroxide Zn(OH)2 is an inorganic chemical compound. It also occurs naturally as 3 rare minerals: wülfingite (orthorhombic), ashoverite and sweetite (both tetragonal).

Like the hydroxides of other metals, such as lead, aluminium, beryllium, tin and chromium, Zinc hydroxide (and Zinc oxide), is amphoteric.  Thus it will dissolve readily in a dilute solution of a strong acid, such as HCl, and also in a solution of an alkali such as sodium hydroxide.

Preparation
It can be prepared by adding sodium hydroxide solution, but not in excess, to a solution of any zinc salt. A white precipitate will be seen:
Zn2+ + 2 OH− → Zn(OH)2.

Zn2+ is known to form hexa-aqua ions at high water concentrations and tetra-aqua ions at low concentrations of water  and, thus, this reaction may be better written as the reaction of the aquated ion with hydroxide through donation of a proton, as follows.

 Zn2+(OH2)4(aq) +  OH−(aq) → Zn2+(OH2)3OH−(aq)  +  H2O(l)

Subsequent reactions discussed below can also, therefore, be considered as reactions with the aquated zinc ion and one can adjust them accordingly.  However, for simplicity, the water molecules are omitted from here-on.

If excess sodium hydroxide is added, the precipitate of zinc hydroxide will dissolve, forming a colorless solution of zincate ion:
Zn(OH)2 + 2 OH− → Zn(OH)42−.

This property can be used as a test for zinc ions in solution, but it is not exclusive, since aluminum and lead compounds behave in a very similar manner. Unlike the hydroxides of aluminum and lead, zinc hydroxide also dissolves in excess aqueous ammonia to form a colorless, water-soluble ammine complex.

Zinc hydroxide will dissolve because the ion is normally surrounded by water ligands; when excess sodium hydroxide is added to the solution the hydroxide ions will reduce the complex to a −2 charge and make it soluble. When excess ammonia is added, it sets up an equilibrium which provides hydroxide ions; the formation of hydroxide ions causes a similar reaction as sodium hydroxide and creates a +2 charged complex with a co-ordination number of 4 with the ammonia ligands - this makes the complex soluble so that it dissolves.

Applications
One major use is as an absorbent in surgical dressings.
It is also used to find zinc salts by mixing sodium hydroxide with the suspect salt.

References

 Chemistry in Context - By Graham Hill, John Holman (pp. 283,284)

zinc
hydroxide